Kaduva is a 2022 Indian Malayalam language action film directed by Shaji Kailas, written by Jinu V. Abraham and produced by Prithviraj Productions and Magic Frames. It stars Prithviraj Sukumaran in the title role alongside Vivek Oberoi and Samyuktha Menon.

Set in 1990s, the plot revolves around an ego war between plantation owner Kaduvakunnel Kuriyachan and I.G. Joseph Chandy. Principal photography took place from April 2021 to March 2022 at Pala, Aruvithura, Vandiperiyar, Mundakkayam and Ernakulam. Jakes Bejoy composed the original songs and film score.

Kaduva was released on 7 July 2022. The film became the third-highest-grossing Malayalam film of 2022 by grossing over 50 crore at the box office.

Plot
In the late 1990s, Kaduvakunnel Kurian Koruthu alias Kaduvakunnel Kuriyachan "Kaduva", a rich planter and businessman in Pala, is brought to district jail in Kottayam where a murder attempt is made on Kaduva by three goons from Kottarakkara sub-jail, under the orders from I.G Joseph Chandy alias Ousepputty, but Kaduva defeats them.

Before getting arrested, Kaduva was living a happy life with his family consisting of his wife Elsa and children Tessa, Eva and son Chacko. However, he happened to have an ego-tussle between him and Joseph Chandy, due to Joseph Chandy's mother Cheddathi lying that the piano was gifted to the church's corrupted Fr. Robin Poovampura, instead of the church, which led to Kaduva getting enraged and insulting Joseph Chandy's father Karikandhathil Chandichayan. Due to this, Joseph Chandy swore vengeance against Kaduva.

Later, Joseph Chandy transferred all the policemen in Pala and includes S.I Dominic Benjamin, whose father Benjamin was thrashed by Kaduva earlier. Joseph Chandy bought a land that belonged to an American family, which was sold by Kaduva and also created a ruckus at his bar. With his influence, Joseph Chandy issued a search warrant on Kaduva's house. On his way back home, Kaduva was intercepted by S.I Rajeevan, who begun a search at his jeep where he tried to arrest Kaduva in arms licence case, but Kaduva thrashed them and was arrested, where his bar licence had been revoked, due to his involvement in spirit smuggling.

After narrating his past, Kaduva is later released from prison after two weeks and learns that his father's Ambassador car has been seized by Benjamin, and Tessa has suffered from a leg fracture. However, Tessa secretly tells him that Robin was the one behind Tessa's accident, when he tried to molest Elsa. Tessa makes Kaduva promise to not cause any trouble. Kaduva meets his friend Victor in which he learns that Dominic had made Victor's eardrum bleed as he was about to file a petition against the cops to the CM Ananthanathan and DGP.

Meanwhile, Ananthanathan is dethroned from the ministry post due to his corrupt activities coming into limelight where it is revealed that Kaduva had met his sister Leena's classmate Maalam Sunny in prison, where he learns that the evidence linking to the politician's illegal activities are with Francis Paul and Kunjithomman. After his release and with Sunny's help, Kaduva makes a deal with Francis and Thomman to provide the video evidence of the party's corruption, in exchange for money and leadership changes in the party, to which they agree. Due to the deal, Kaduva had sold some of his estate. After Thomman becomes the CM and Sunny's release from prison, Kaduva brutally thrashes up Robin and dumps him in the church's well, where he also issues a frozen promotion of Joseph Chandy's ADGP post due to multiple accusations.

Kaduva thrashes Dominic, when he was asking a bribe, and also retrieves his father's Ambassador car back. Ananthanathan learns that there will be raid in his house by the central vigilance department and ask Joseph Chandy to transport the goods to a safe place. Joseph Chandy attempts to transports the goods to his plantation in Anakkara, only to be thwarted by Kaduva. The goods are found and Joseph Chandy is suspended. Enraged, Joseph Chandy hires a goon in a mental asylum to kill Kaduva at a church festival. He stabs Kaduva's friends and tries to kill Elsa but Kaduva manages to thrash him and his goons to death, where he fights Joseph Chandy and defeats him. Joseph Chandy is later arrested on charges of unaccounted money.

Kaduva also blackmails Thomman and Paul for a lifetime commitment, when he shows a video of the meeting between him and the duo (Paul and Thomman). While leaving for prison, Joseph Chandy tells Kaduva that their feud is not over and promises to meet soon, to which Kaduva agrees.

Cast

Prithviraj Sukumaran as Kaduvakunnel Kuriyachen "Kaduva"
Vivek Oberoi as IG Joseph Chandy IPS
Samyuktha Menon as Elsa Kurian, Kuriyachan's wife
Alencier Ley Lopez as Varkey, Kuriyachen's mentor 
Baiju Santhosh as Advocate Korah, Kuriyachan's friend
Arjun Ashokan as Victor, Kuriyachan's friend
Kalabhavan Shajohn as SI Dominic Benjamin
Priyanka Nair as Thankama, Joseph's wife 
Rahul Madhav as Fr. Robin Poovampara
Janardhanan as Ananthanathan, former Chief Minister of Kerala
Seema as Theruthi Chedathi, Joseph's mother
Innocent as Fr. Vattasheril
Suresh Krishna as Kunji Thomman, New Chief Minister of Kerala
Nandhu as SI Manmadhan, Kuriyachan's friend
Shivaji Guruvayoor as Revenue Minister Thomas Poovampara
Vijayakumar as CI Rajeevan, Kuriyachan's friend
Aneesh G. Menon as Sunny
Joy Mathew as Bishop of Palai
Sudheesh as Mathai
V. K. Sreeraman as Bishop of Wayanad
Sudheer Karamana as Jail Superintendent
Chali Pala as Chauro Chettan
Balaji Sharma as Jail Warden
Abu Salim as Benjamin, Dominic's father
Aarish Anoop as Chacko Kurian, Kuriyachen's son
Angelina Abraham as Tessa Kurian, Kuriyachen's elder daughter
Vriddhi Vishal as Eva Kurian, Kuriyachen's younger daughter
Jaise Jose as Thankaserry Lopes, a prisoner
Rajesh Hebbar as Dr. Paulachan, Kuriyachen's friend
Kottayam Ramesh as Fr. Gabriel
John Kaippalllil as ASI John Ignatius
Malavika Menon as Mary
Gouri Parvathi as Victor's sister
Jolly Chirayath as Victor's mother
Saju Navodaya as Sankaran, a prisoner
Renji Panicker as Judge (voice-over)
N F Varghese as Karikandathil Chandychan, Joseph's late father (photo archive)

Production

Development
Kaduva was officially announced on 16 October 2019 on Prithviraj Sukumaran's birthday, to be directed by Shaji Kailas and written by Jinu V. Abraham, along with a poster featuring Prithviraj captioned "inspired from a true story". Jointly produced by Prithviraj's Prithviraj Productions and Listin Stephen's Magic Frames. Abraham said, although the film is inspired by a true story, it constitutes only five percent of the film and rest is fictional, which is set in 1990s. He first narrated the screenplay to Prithviraj, who suggested Kailas' name as director and brought him on board. The film was expected to begin production in March 2020 as soon as Prithviraj completes Aadujeevitham.

Prithviraj plays the character of Kaduvakunnel Kuryachan, a young planter from a Christian family in Pala. Prithviraj said, though he received the screenplay only in early 2019 he had heard about the character even before that. Prithviraj was filming for Driving Licence when he called Kailas for directing the film. It was after Kailas agreed to do the film Prithviraj and Listin decided to produce it. Shooting which was scheduled to begin somewhere in mid-2020 was postponed due to the COVID-19 pandemic in India. In June that year, an untitled film to be directed by Mathews Thomas, produced by Tomichan Mulakuppadam, and starring Suresh Gopi was announced, which bears the same character name Kaduvakunnel Kuruvachan. This prompted Abraham to file a case against them at District Court, Ernakulam alleging plagiarism. The court stayed its production and promotional activities as Abraham's screenplay was registered under copyright law. Beside character name, promotional materials of SG250 (working title) also bears similarity to what is depicted in Kaduva poster, said Abraham. The initial title he found for Kaduva was Kaduvakunnel Kuruvachan and the screenplay was also registered under that title, it was changed after producer Stephen asked him to choose a shorter title. Abraham said Mathews had worked under him as an assistant director and had known him since 2011, with whom he had discussed stories, including Kaduva.

In October 2020, upholding the order of District Court, the High Court of Kerala gave clearance to Kaduva to proceed with production while restricting SG250 from making a film unless they create a new character and make major changes in the screenplay. A plea challenging the stay order of District Court was filed by the makers of SG250 (officially titled Ottakkomban), but it was dismissed by the Supreme Court of India in April 2022.

A petitioner, Kuruvinakunnel expressed doubt as whether Kaduva and SG250 are based on his life. Clarifying that, Kailas said it was Abraham who came to him with the screenplay which he originally wrote for another director, and Kaduva is not based on Kuruvinakunnel's life and Abraham's Kuruvachan is an imaginary character who also happens to be a planter. The District Court s quashed the petition and questioned the intentions of the petitioner in filing a case just before the release of the movie.

Casting
Prithviraj said that they shortlisted several names for the character of Joseph Chandy, and at one time considered Biju Menon for the role, but since both Prithviraj and Menon has done similar roles in Ayyappanum Koshiyum they ruled out Menon and ultimately zeroed in Vivek Oberoi as per majority opinion. There were rumours that Mohanlal was part of the cast, appearing in a cameo role. Addressing it, Kailas clarified that they indeed had planned to cast Mohanlal in a cameo role, but it did not work out.

Filming
Principal photography began on 17 April 2021. However, by the end of that month, filming was suspended after a surge in COVID-19 cases in Kerala. After completing Alone, Kailas began the second schedule of Kaduva on 24 October, which was expected to last for 70 days. Prithviraj joined in the second schedule. Oberoi joined the set in November. Abinandhan Ramanujam was the cinematographer. Filming was completed in March 2022.

The film was mainly shot at locations in Pala and Erattupetta in Kottayam district and Vandiperiyar in Idukki district. Since the film is set in 1990s, they wanted to recreate old District Court, Kottayam, it was created as set in a 4-5 acre land at Ernakulam. While filming in Mundakkayam, there was a 50-person limit pertaining to COVID-19 restrictions set by the government. At Mundakkayam, the crew suffered flood and landslide, the set constructed was damaged. Filming went past three waves of COVID-19 in India. Prithviraj and Kailas was tested COVID-19 positive. Five fight sequences and three songs were filmed for the film. Kalabhavan Shajohn was tested COVID-19 positive while filming in Kochi. The film took two years to complete, overcoming COVID-19 pandemic, flood, and landslide.

Music
The film was announced with Thaman. S as the music director, making his Malayalam debut. But after the project was delayed,  Thaman was replaced by Jakes Bejoy. The first single was released on 19 June 2022.

Release

Theatrical
Kaduva was released on 7 July 2022. In addition, the film will be released in dubbed versions of Tamil, Kannada, Hindi, and Telugu languages. It was initially scheduled for a theatrical release on 30 June 2022. The team promoted the film at an event in Bangalore and Chennai.

Home media
The digital streaming rights of the film are acquired by Amazon Prime Video and Hindi version by Disney+ Hotstar. The film  was digitally streamed on Amazon Prime Video from 4 August 2022The satellite rights of the film were sold to Surya TV.

Reception

Box office 
On its opening day, the film had grossed around 7 crore. On its third day, the film has earned around 15 crore at the Kerala box office. On the seventh day of its release, the film has grossed around 30.20 crore and became one of hit ventures in Mollywood after Bheeshma Parvam, Hridayam and Jana Gana Mana.

Critical response 
Kaduva received mixed reviews from critics.

Sajin Shrijith of The New Indian Express rated 3.5 out of 5 and stated "We need to see the bad guys do something that would provoke our ire so that when, finally, the hero returns for payback, we take delight in every punch that lands. Thankfully, Kaduva follows this philosophy to a T, and I had quite a blast."

Arjun Menon of Pinkvilla rated the film to be 3.5 out of 5 stars stating that "However, the film is a made-for-theatre watch, aided by a splendidly enjoyable background score from Jakes Bejoy and the thunderous frames that elevate the commonplace plot to new heights of first-rate commercial filmmaking that is meant to be experienced with a bunch of strangers in a dark room. Yes, Kaduva might have just saved Malayalam cinema for all we know or set off a new focus on narrating larger-than-life tales with the grounded, economy of new-age storytelling.

Cris of The News Minute gave the film 3.5 out of 5 stars and stated that "The film starts and ends in the middle of nowhere, extracting a slice of Kuriachan's life. You do get to taste a bit of nostalgia in seeing land phones, Doordarshan's intro theme and a single television reporter in front of the CM. But the rest of the film is just a nicely edited long and unexciting script." Anna Mathews of The Times of India rated the film 3 out of 5 and wrote "If you are in the mood for a Prithviraj mass thriller, you might enjoy the movie, but don't expect to be wow-ed."

India Today gave 2.5 out of 5 stars and wrote "Kaduva is entertaining despite its predictability. But, a little bit of inventiveness could have elevated Kaduva more."  Jayadeep Jayesh of Deccan Herald gave 2.5 out of 5 and stated "'Kaduva' can be appreciated for representing a style of filmmaking that Malayalam cinema has long forgotten. There are many nostalgia-inducing moments and Prithviraj's charisma is captivating. Apart from these aspects, the film is just average.

Vishal Menon of Film Companion after reviewing the film wrote "Yet you have to give it to Jakes Bejoy's background score and Abhinandan Ramanujam's camera for working overtime to re-interpret what could have been a 30-year-old film. Not only do they get exactly what the director's trying to make, but they also give it their own individual tributes to make something old feel new. The result is a balls-out unpretentious action movie that owns every second of its pitch as an ultimate male revenge fantasy."

Anna M. M. Vetticad of Firstpost rated the film to be 1.75 out of 5 stating that "There is a lot of physical movement in Kaduva – fists and legs swing across the screen, vehicles speed and overturn, bodies spin in mid-air. Shaji Kailas' storytelling though remains frozen in time, back in the 1990s when he first shot into the limelight, as unmoving as the mundu tucked around Kuriyaachan's waist." Manoj Kumar R of The Indian Express after reviewing the film wrote "And this entire movie, which is a celebration of vanity, is so excruciatingly dull. One can't help but wonder, who still finds slow-motion walks and frequent twirls of moustache a product of big-screen entertainment?"

S. R. Praveen of The Hindu stated that "Shaji does manage to deliver that, dipped in more than an ounce of predictability, but for those looking for some novelty, Kaduva might not be it. This is despite it being a notch better than all of the work that Shaji has done post-2000."

References

External links
 

2022 action films
Indian action drama films
Films scored by Jakes Bejoy
Films directed by Shaji Kailas
Fictional portrayals of the Kerala Police
2020s Malayalam-language films